Maya Stange is an Australian television and film actress known for starring roles in the films In a Savage Land, Garage Days and XX/XY. She also had recurring roles on the TV series Love Child and A Place to Call Home. She was born in Perth, Western Australia.

Filmography

Film

Television

References

External links
 

Australian film actresses
Australian television actresses
Year of birth missing (living people)
Living people
Actresses from Perth, Western Australia